Human Ecology: An Interdisciplinary Journal is a quarterly peer-reviewed academic journal covering research on human ecology. It was established in 1972 by Andrew P. Vayda. The editor-in-chief is Daniel Bates (City University of New York).

Abstracting and indexing 
The journal is abstracted and indexed in:

According to the Journal Citation Reports, the journal has a 2021 impact factor of 2.728.

References

External links 
 

Human ecology
Environmental social science journals
Springer Science+Business Media academic journals
Quarterly journals
Publications established in 1972
English-language journals